Double or Quits may refer to:

 Double or nothing, or often double or quits in the UK, a gamble to decide whether a loss or debt should be doubled
 Double or Quits (1938 film), a British crime film
 Double or Quits (1953 film), a French comedy film